How To Be A Fan With Hex is an Australian observational documentary web series created and presented by Stephanie Bendixsen. The show originally aired on ABC iview on September 5, 2016. This web series' goal is to explore fandoms of different pop culture branches, and to figure out exactly what drives individuals to participate in these groups, through Bendixsen's interviews and engagement in the activities.

Episodes

References

External links
  - official ABC iview site

Documentary web series
2016 web series debuts
Australian non-fiction web series